Ichneutica acontistis is a moth of the family Noctuidae. It is endemic to New Zealand and is found only in the South Island, mainly on the eastern side although not in the Nelson district. This species is similar in appearance to I. paraxysta, I. stulta and I. toroneura. I. acontistis is unlikely to be confused with I. paraxysta as the later is only found in the North Island. I. acontistis can be distinguished from I. stulta as the latter species has a strongly curved forewing edge where as I. acontistis''' is straight. I. acontistis can be distinguished from I. toroneura as the former has a dark stroke of colour starting from the base of the forewing that I. toroneura lacks. I. acontistis inhabits tussock grasslands and the larvae of this species feed on species of grass found in the genera Poa, Elymus and Rytidosperma. It pupates under rocks and adults are on the wing from September to January. I. acontistis are attracted to light.

 Taxonomy 
This species was described by Edward Meyrick in 1887 from a male specimen collected at Castle Hill by John Davies Enys and named Leucania acontistis.  The holotype specimen is held at the Canterbury Museum. In 1988, in his catalogue of New Zealand Lepidoptera, J. S. Dugdale placed this species within the Tmetolophota genus. In 2019 Robert Hoare undertook a major review of New Zealand Noctuidae. During this review the genus Ichneutica was greatly expanded and the genus Tmetolophota was subsumed into that genus as a synonym. As a result of this review, this species is now known as Ichneutica acontistis. Description 
The larvae of this species have yet to be described.

Meyrick described the adult of the species as follows:

The wingspan of the adult male of this species is between 31 and 39.5 mm and for the female is between 32 and 38.5 mm.

Although I. acontistis is similar in appearance to I. paraxysta confusion is unlikely to happen as I. acontistis is found only in the South Island and I. paraxysta is found only in the North Island. Other species that are also similar in appearance to this species are I. stulta and I. toroneura. I. acontistis can be distinguished from I. stulta as I. acontistis has an almost straight leading edge of the forewing where as in specimens of I. stulta this forewing edge is strongly curved. I. acontistis also lacks the discal spot found on the underside of the hindwing which is present in specimens of I. stulta. I. acontistis can be distinguished from I. toroneura as I. acontistis have the dark stroke of colour starting from the base of the forewing that I. toroneura lacks.

 Distribution Ichneutica acontistis is endemic to New Zealand. This species only found in the South Island and tends to be present on the eastern side of that island. However it has yet to be collected and may be absent from the Nelson district. 

 Habitat Ichneutica acontistis inhabits tussock grasslands.

 Behaviour 
Adults are on the wing from September to January. They are attracted to light. This species doesn't appear to have suffered the sharp decreased in population occurring to species that inhabited similar habitat to species during the early 1960s to the late 1980s.  

 Life cycle and host species 
Larvae feed on tussock grassland species within the genera Poa, Elymus and Rytidosperma.'' Adult moths have been reared from pupae that were found under rocks.

References

Hadeninae
Moths described in 1887
Moths of New Zealand
Taxa named by Edward Meyrick
Endemic fauna of New Zealand
Endemic moths of New Zealand